The  are electric multiple unit train types operated by Fukuoka City Transportation Bureau on the Nanakuma Line in Fukuoka, Japan.

Design
The exterior was designed by the German industrial designer Alexander Neumeister. Each side of the cars is equipped with three pairs of doors. The bodyside is white with a small light-green line which runs from the front along the top of the windows. This represents the ridge of Mount Abura (located in Jōnan-ku, Sawara-ku and Minami-ku, Fukuoka). Muromi River (located in Nishi-ku and Sawara-ku, Fukuoka) is represented by a light blue stripe along the bottom of the train. There is an emergency door at each end of the train.

Equipment
Trainsets consist of four cars, all motored. The trains are equipped with ATO and can be operated unmanned, but driver-only operation is used. The trains use Insulated-gate bipolar transistor (IGBT), a variable-frequency drive system, and LED train destination indicator panels. All cars are air-conditioned.

History
Unlike the 1000 series and 2000 series trains operated on the Kūkō Line and Hakozaki Line, the 3000 series trains are standard gauge and use linear motor propulsion.

3000A series 

A further four sets were ordered in 2021.

Externally, these sets distinguished from older sets by their sky-blue and green livery. The Fukuoka City Transportation Bureau reports that the heightened seats are designed to be easier to sit on and stand up from.

The first set was delivered in September 2021, and the 3000A series sets made their first trips in revenue service in February 2022.

References

Electric multiple units of Japan
3000 series
Train-related introductions in 2005
Hitachi multiple units
1500 V DC multiple units of Japan